The National Heritage Database is an online database containing information about various types of heritage-listed places in Australia and around the world.

It is a searchable database which includes:
places in the World Heritage List;
places in the Australian National Heritage List;
places in the Commonwealth National Heritage List;
places in the Register of the National Estate (a non-statutory archived list);
places in the List of Overseas Places of Historic Significance to Australia; and
places that have ever been considered for, or are currently under consideration for, any one of these lists.

References

Heritage registers in Australia
Heritage registers
Online databases